FOX Arena (formerly Arena) is an Australian general entertainment cable and satellite channel available on Foxtel, Austar, and Optus Television's subscription platforms.

History

In the late 1990s, Arena had the slogan "The Art of Television". It ran a mix of programs, including UK serial Coronation Street, and cult horror and science fictions films presented by Tabitha Clutterbuck. This included programs from E! prior to the launch of E! in Australia.

On 1 March 2001 it relaunched, with an added focus on talk shows and celebrity.

On 31 July 2005, its look was again updated, with a new logo and the new slogan, "Great TV Any time".

It was owned and operated by XYZnetworks until 1 October 2007 when management and programming were taken over by Foxtel, with XYZ Networks still retaining ownership.

In April 2008, Foxtel announced a partnership with Universal Networks International, where Arena would be re-branded as an Australian version of the American channel Bravofeaturing original series from the network, and adopting a variation of Bravo's branding and slogan, whilst retaining the previous Arena name.

On 1 June 2010, Arena TV switched from standard 4:3 to 16:9 widescreen programming. Many of Arena's programmes like Gilmore Girls, Two and a Half Men, How I Met Your Mother and One Tree Hill amongst other shows are originally presented in widescreen. Arena TV's switch to widescreen is part of Foxtel's plan to have every channel in widescreen by the end of 2010.

On 3 November 2014, Arena launched a HD feed. In addition, Arena + 2 moved from channel 154 to channel 151.

On 1 July 2020, the channel rebranded as FOX Arena with a new logo and tagline ‘Live Out Loud.’ The channel now operates as part of Foxtel's LifeStyle suite of television networks.

Slogans

Programming

Current original programming
Project Runway Australia (2008–present)
The Real Housewives of Melbourne (2014–present)
The Real Housewives of Sydney (2017)

Current syndicated programming
The Drew Barrymore Show

Former original programming
Confidential (2007 on FOX8, 2008 on Arena)
Park Street (Australian TV series) (2011)
WAG Nation (2012)
Untitled top secret project (cancelled)

References

External links
 Official site

1995 establishments in Australia
English-language television stations in Australia
Television networks in Australia
Television channels and stations established in 1995
Foxtel